Frank Benjamin Foster III (September 23, 1928 – July 26, 2011) was an American tenor and soprano saxophonist, flautist, arranger, and composer. Foster collaborated frequently with Count Basie and worked as a bandleader from the early 1950s. In 1998, Howard University awarded Frank Foster with the Benny Golson Jazz Master Award.

Early life and education
Foster was born in Cincinnati, Ohio, United States, and educated at Wilberforce University. In 1949, he moved to Detroit, Michigan, where he joined the local jazz scene, playing with musicians such as Wardell Gray.

Career
Drafted into the U.S. Army in 1951, Foster served in Korea with the 7th Infantry Division where he fought alongside (although unknowingly) future collaborator Shawn ‘Thunder’ Wallace. Upon finishing his military service in 1953 he joined Count Basie's big band. Foster contributed both arrangements and original compositions to Count Basie's band including the standard "Shiny Stockings", and other popular songs such as "Down for the Count", "Blues Backstage", "Back to the Apple", "Discommotion", and "Blues in Hoss' Flat", as well as arrangements for the entire Easin' It album.

From 1970 to 1972 (and on occasional later dates) he played with Elvin Jones, and in 1972 and 1975 with the Thad Jones–Mel Lewis big band. Foster was an Artist in Residence at the New England Conservatory of Music in Boston in 1971. That same year, he also started teaching for the New York City Public School System in District 5, Harlem, as part of a team of six professional musicians assigned to the Federal Government's Title I Program: Cultural Enrichment Through Music, Dance, and Song. From 1972 to 1976, Foster was full-time Assistant Professor in the Black Studies Program at the State University of New York at Buffalo (SUNY).

Foster also formed and lead several groups, most notably Living Color and The Loud Minority. He co-led a quintet with Frank Wess in 1983, and toured Europe as a member of Jimmy Smith's quintet in 1985.

In June 1986, Foster succeeded Thad Jones as leader of the Count Basie Orchestra. While leading the Basie Orchestra, Foster received two Grammy Awards: first for his big-band arrangement of the Diane Schuur composition "Deedles' Blues" (Best Arrangement Accompanying a Vocal, Jazz category, 1987), and second for his arrangement of guitarist/vocalist George Benson's composition "Basie's Bag" (Best Big Band Instrumental, Jazz category, 1988).

After leaving the band in 1995, Foster resumed his leadership of three musical groups: The Non-Electric Company (a jazz quartet/quintet), Swing Plus (a 12-piece band), and The Loud Minority Big Band (an 18-piece concert jazz orchestra), each of which he had organized years prior to assuming leadership of the Basie unit in 1986.

Frank Foster suffered a stroke in 2001, that impaired his left side to the extent that he could no longer play the saxophone. After continuing to lead the Loud Minority on limited engagements for much of the 2000s, he turned his leadership responsibilities for the band over to Cecil Bridgewater, a prominent New York City jazz musician. Until his death Foster continued composing and arranging at his home in Chesapeake, Virginia, where he resided with his wife and personal manager of nearly 45 years, Cecilia Foster. He died of kidney failure on July 26, 2011.

Awards and commissions
Foster received two Grammy Awards: the first, for his big band arrangement of the Diane Schuur composition "Deedles' Blues" (Best Arrangement Accompanying a Vocal, 1987), and the second for his arrangement of guitarist/vocalist George Benson's composition "Basie's Bag" (Best Jazz Instrumental Performance, Big Band, 1990). He also received two Grammy nominations: for his big band arrangement of Charles Trenet's composition "Beyond the Sea", and for an album with his fellow Basie alumnus Frank Wess entitled Frankly Speaking (Concord Jazz, 1985).
He composed and orchestrated material for The Carnegie Hall Jazz Ensemble, The Detroit Civic Symphony Orchestra, The Ithaca College Jazz Ensemble, The Jazzmobile Corporation of New York City, the Lincoln Center Jazz Orchestra, The Malaysia Symphony Orchestra, The Metropole Orchestra of Hilversum, the Netherlands, and The Thad Jones/Mel Lewis Orchestra. In 1983 Dizzy Gillespie personally commissioned Frank Foster to orchestrate one of the jazz icon's compositions, "Con Alma", for a scheduled performance and recording with The London Philharmonic Orchestra directed by Robert Farnon.
In 1987, he was awarded an honorary doctorate by Central State University in Wilberforce.
In 2002, the National Endowment for the Arts presented Foster with its NEA Jazz Masters Award, the highest honor in jazz.
Foster was commissioned by The Harpers Ferry Historical Association of West Virginia to compose a jazz suite of ten to fifteen minutes' duration in connection with the Niagara Movement, relating to John Brown's famous raid on Harpers Ferry. The suite was performed by the Count Basie Orchestra at Harpers Ferry as part of the three-day Niagara Movement celebration in August 2006.
Jazz at Lincoln Center commissioned Foster to compose and arrange music for the Lincoln Center Jazz Orchestra, directed by Wynton Marsalis, for performances on March 13–15, 2008, with "A Man and a Woman" as the theme. Foster wrote the words, music, and orchestrations for "I Love You (Based on Your Availability)" and "Romance Without Substance Is a Nuisance", both performed by vocalists Dennis Rowland and Marlena Shaw.
On March 20, 2009, the Chicago Jazz Ensemble, directed by Jon Faddis, performed a three-part suite by Foster titled "Chi-Town Is My Town and My Town's No Shy Town" at the Harris Theater in Chicago.
In 2009, Foster selected The Jazz Archive at Duke University to be the home for his numerous compositions, arrangements, and personal papers.

Humanitarian causes
Foster became a great supporter of The Jazz Foundation of America in their mission to save the homes and the lives of America's elderly jazz and blues musicians including musicians who survived Hurricane Katrina. After receiving help from the Jazz Foundation, he supported the cause by performing in their Annual Benefit Concert "A Great Night in Harlem" in 2008.

He donated his gold-plated tenor sax to be auctioned by the Jazz Foundation of America, the proceeds of which went to support the foundation's non-profit programs, especially working gigs and educational programs for victims of hurricane Katrina in New Orleans and the Gulf Coast.

Discography

As leader
1953: Here Comes Frank Foster: Frank Foster Quintet with Benny Powell (Blue Note)
1955: Hope Meets Foster (Prestige) with Elmo Hope
1956: No 'Count (Savoy)
1963: Basie Is Our Boss (Argo)
1965: Fearless Frank Foster (Prestige)
1966: Soul Outing! (Prestige)
1968: Manhattan Fever (Blue Note)
1974: The Loud Minority (Mainstream)
1976: Here and Now (Catalyst)
1977: Shiny Stockings (Denon)
1978: Twelve Shades of Black (Leo)
1979: Non-Electric Company (EPM Musique)
1982: The House That Love Built (SteepleChase)
1983: Two for the Blues (Pablo) with Frank Wess
1984: Frankly Speaking (Concord Jazz) with Frank Wess
1985: Generations (Muse) with Pepper Adams 
1992: The Count Basie Orchestra Directed by Frank Foster Live at El Morocco (Telarc)
1995: A Fresh Taste of Thad Jones and Frank Foster (Hänssler Classics)
1996: Leo Rising (Arabesque)
1998: Swing (live) (Challenge)
2002: Live at Feuerwache Mannheim (Bassic)
2003: We Do It Diff'rent (live) (Mapleshade)
2004: Settin' the Pace (GJazz)
2005: Endless Fingers (Arabesque)
2007: Well Water (Piadrum)

As arranger
 1961: "Little Man (You've Had a Busy Day)" – Sarah Vaughan with the Count Basie Orchestra - Count Basie/Sarah Vaughan (Roulette)
 1965: Sarah Vaughan – ¡Viva! Vaughan (Mercury)
 1984: "Mack the Knife" – Frank Sinatra – L.A. Is My Lady (Qwest/Warner Bros.)
 1984: "After You've Gone" – Frank Sinatra – L.A. Is My Lady (Qwest/Warner Bros.)
 1985: "Beyond the Sea" – George Benson – 20/20
 1987: Diane Schuur and the Count Basie Orchestra – Diane Schuur & the Count Basie Orchestra (GRP)
 1990: George Benson featuring the Count Basie Orchestra – Big Boss Band

As sideman
With Pepper Adams
The Adams Effect (Uptown, 1985 [1988])
With Lorez Alexandria
Early in the Morning (Argo, 1960)
With Count Basie
 Count Basie and the Kansas City 7 (Impulse 1962)
With Count Basie Orchestra
 Dance Session (Clef, 1953)
 Dance Session Album #2 (Clef, 1954)
 Basie (Clef, 1954)
 Count Basie Swings, Joe Williams Sings (Clef, 1955) with Joe Williams
 April in Paris (Verve, 1956)
 The Greatest!! Count Basie Plays, Joe Williams Sings Standards with Joe Williams
 Metronome All-Stars 1956 (Clef, 1956) with Ella Fitzgerald and Joe Williams
 Hall of Fame (Verve, 1956 [1959])
 Basie in London (Verve, 1956)
 One O'Clock Jump (1957)
 Count Basie at Newport (Verve, 1957)
 The Atomic Mr. Basie (Roulette, 1957) aka Basie and E=MC2
 Sing Along with Basie (Roulette, 1958) with Joe Williams and Lambert, Hendricks & Ross
 Breakfast Dance and Barbecue (Roulette, 1959)
 Everyday I Have the Blues (Roulette, 1959) with Joe Williams
 Dance Along with Basie (Roulette, 1959)
 Not Now, I'll Tell You When (Roulette, 1960)
 The Count Basie Story (Roulette, 1960)
 Kansas City Suite (Roulette, 1960)
 The Legend (Roulette, 1961)
 Back with Basie (Roulette, 1962)
 On My Way & Shoutin' Again! (Verve, 1962)
 This Time by Basie! (Reprise, 1963)
 More Hits of the 50's and 60's (Verve, 1963)
 The Board of Directors (Dot, 1967) with The Mills Brothers
With George Benson
 Body Talk (CTI, 1973)
 Big Boss Band (Warner Bros., 1990)
With Kenny Burrell
 Kenny Burrell Volume 2 (Blue Note, 1956)
 Swingin' (Blue Note, 1956 [rel. 1980])
With Donald Byrd
 Byrd's Word (Savoy, 1955)
 All Day Long (Prestige, 1957)
 Fancy Free (Blue Note, 1970)
 Electric Byrd (Blue Note, 1970)
 Kofi (Blue Note, 1971)
With Earl Coleman
 Manhattan Serenade (1968)
With Matthew Gee
 Jazz by Gee (Riverside, 1956)
With Bennie Green and Gene Ammons
 The Swingin'est (VeeJay 1958)
With Coleman Hawkins
The Saxophone Section (World Wide, 1958)
With Eddie Higgins
Eddie Higgins (Vee-Jay, 1961)
With Elmo Hope
 Trio and Quintet (Blue Note, 1954)
 Homecoming! (Riverside, 1961)
With Milt Jackson
 Plenty, Plenty Soul (Atlantic, 1957)
With Illinois Jacquet
 The Soul Explosion (Prestige, 1969)
With Elvin Jones
 Elvin! (Riverside, 1961–62)
 Heavy Sounds with Richard Davis (Impulse!, 1967)
 Coalition (Blue Note, 1970)
 Genesis (Blue Note, 1971)
 Merry-Go-Round (Blue Note, 1971)
 At This Point in Time (Blue Note, 1973)
 New Agenda (Vanguard, 1975)
 The Main Force (Vanguard, 1976)
 Time Capsule (Vanguard, 1977)
 Elvin Jones Music Machine (Mark Levison, 1978)
 Live in Japan 1978: Dear John C. (Trio (Japan), 1978)
 Elvin Jones Jazz Machine Live in Japan Vol. 2 (Trio (Japan), 1978)
 Live at the Village Vanguard Volume One (Landmark, 1984With Jimmy McGriffWith Quincy Jones Golden Boy (Mercury, 1964)With Thad Jones'''Mad Thad (Period, 1956)
With Ronnie Mathews
Roots, Branches & Dances (Bee Hive, 1978)
With Jimmy McGriff
 The Big Band (Solid State, 1966)
With Thelonious Monk
 Monk (Prestige 1954)
With Joe Newman
 The Count's Men (Jazztone, 1955)
 I Feel Like a Newman (Storyville, 1956)
 Good 'n' Groovy (Prestige Swingville, 1961)
With Horace Parlan
 Frank-ly Speaking (SteepleChase 1977)
With Duke Pearson
 Introducing Duke Pearson's Big Band (Blue Note 1967)
 Now Hear This (Blue Note 1968)
 It Could Only Happen with You (Blue Note 1970)
With Hilton Ruiz
Excition (SteepleChase, 1977)
Steppin' Into Beauty (SteepleChase, 1977 [1982])
With Woody Shaw
 The Woody Shaw Concert Ensemble at the Berliner Jazztage (Muse, 1976)
With Mickey Tucker
 Mister Mysterious (Muse, 1978)
With Eddie "Cleanhead" Vinson
Clean Head's Back in Town (Bethlehem, 1957)
With George Wallington
 Showcase (Blue Note 1954)
With Cedar Walton
 Mobius (RCA, 1975)
With Julius Watkins
 Julius Watkins Sextet (Blue Note, 1954)
With Frank Wess
 North, South, East....Wess (Savoy 1956)
 Surprise, Surprise (Chiaroscuro, 1996)

See also
 List of jazz arrangers

References

External links
Frank Foster bio-documentary "Shiny Stockings"
Frank Foster Papers Rubenstein Rare Book and Manuscript Library, Duke University
Foster's Entry in All About Jazz
Interview with Foster
Smithsonian Institution Oral History Interview with Frank Foster (1998)

1928 births
2011 deaths
Musicians from Cincinnati
Big band bandleaders
Big band saxophonists
American jazz flautists
Swing saxophonists
Bebop saxophonists
Hard bop saxophonists
Progressive big band bandleaders
American music arrangers
Grammy Award winners
Wilberforce University alumni
Count Basie Orchestra members
Savoy Records artists
Challenge Records artists
Blue Note Records artists
SteepleChase Records artists
Mainstream Records artists
Deaths from kidney failure
Progressive big band musicians
Mapleshade Records artists